The Post-Star is a daily newspaper in Glens Falls, New York. Its circulation is 9,780. It serves the counties of Warren, Washington and Saratoga in New York State including the cities of Glens Falls and Saratoga Springs. It is the only daily newspaper published in Warren County. It competes with The Saratogian of Saratoga Springs and the Times Union of Albany for the Saratoga County market.

History
The current Post-Star newspaper traces its roots to 1904 with the founding of a paper called The Morning Post.

In 1909 the owners of The Morning Post acquired a competing newspaper called The Morning Star and merged the two papers into The Post-Star.

The newspaper was sold in 1971 by longtime publisher and major shareholder Arthur Irving Sr. to Howard Publications.(30 December 1970). Glen Falls Newspapers Have Been Purchased By Howard Publications, Oceanside, Calif; Carl M. Davidson Has Been Named Publisher, The Post-Star, p.1 (paywall)

The Post-Star is currently owned by Lee Enterprises out of Davenport, Iowa. Lee has controlled the paper since February 12, 2002, when it merged with Howard Publications.

On April 20, 2009, the Post-Star won its first Pulitzer Prize, for the editorial work of Mark Mahoney.

For a time, the Post-Star maintained two distinctly different online presences. PostStar.net was an all-inclusive, subscription-based offering; Poststar.com offers the reader a few free articles per month, requiring a subscription beyond that. As of April 2007, PostStar.net ceased operation.

References

External links
 Poststar.com
 Lee Enterprises profile of The Post-Star

Daily newspapers published in New York (state)
Lee Enterprises publications
Glens Falls, New York